David Morgan  (born 30 September 1964) is a Welsh weightlifter.

Morgan won the British under-16 championship in 1979. He became the youngest ever Commonwealth Games weightlifting champion in 1982 at Brisbane, at 17 years of age. Competing in the lightweight class (67.5 kg), he achieved 132.5 kg in the snatch and 162.5 kg in the clean and jerk to defeat former champion Basil (Bill) Stellios of Australia. Morgan is the only competitor to win medals in six different Commonwealth Games, with victories in 1982, 1986, 1990, 1994, 1998, and 2002.  He won two gold and one silver medals in 2002 at Manchester (with 145 kg in the snatch and 160 in the clean and jerk), bringing his career medal total to twelve (nine gold, three silver).

Morgan recorded his best attempt in the snatch at the 1984 Junior World Championships, with a lift of 150 kg which gave him the gold in the snatch in the 75 kg class. He then went on to finish second overall after a clean and jerk of 180k.  This was the first time in 27 years that a British weightlifter has won a gold medal in a world championship.

Morgan placed fourth in the 1984 Summer Olympics. At the 1988 Summer Olympics in Seoul, Morgan competed in the 82.5 kg class and finished fourth again with a total of 365 kg.  David Morgan is also the only person in history to have won overall gold in 5 commonwealth games.

He was appointed Member of the Order of the British Empire (MBE) in the 2020 New Year Honours for services to weightlifting.

References

External links
Commonwealth Games 2002:  Weightlifting:  Morgan has no plans to carry on
Commonwealth Games 2002: Weightlifting: MORGAN RECORD SIX HAUL.(Sport)

1964 births
Living people
Welsh male weightlifters
Olympic weightlifters of Great Britain
Weightlifters at the 1984 Summer Olympics
Weightlifters at the 1988 Summer Olympics
Weightlifters at the 1992 Summer Olympics
Commonwealth Games gold medallists for Wales
Commonwealth Games silver medallists for Wales
Weightlifters at the 1982 Commonwealth Games
Weightlifters at the 1986 Commonwealth Games
Weightlifters at the 1990 Commonwealth Games
Weightlifters at the 1994 Commonwealth Games
Weightlifters at the 1998 Commonwealth Games
Weightlifters at the 2002 Commonwealth Games
Commonwealth Games medallists in weightlifting
Members of the Order of the British Empire
Medallists at the 1986 Commonwealth Games
Medallists at the 1998 Commonwealth Games
Medallists at the 2002 Commonwealth Games